In 1994, several groups were involved in an attempt to relocate the Minnesota Timberwolves of the National Basketball Association (NBA) from Minneapolis, Minnesota to New Orleans, Louisiana. The proposed relocation would have been the second involving a Minneapolis-based franchise in the span of two years, as Minneapolis had lost its National Hockey League (NHL) franchise to Dallas in 1993. Timberwolves owners Marv Wolfenson and Harvey Ratner were considering selling the team due to problems with the mortgage on the Target Center, the team's arena that had been built only four years earlier as part of Minneapolis' 1989 entry into the NBA. The events of the attempted relocation resulted in Glen Taylor, businessman and former Minnesota State Senator, purchasing the team and keeping it in Minneapolis.

After their failed courting of the Timberwolves, New Orleans made attempts to lure the Vancouver Grizzlies and Charlotte Hornets to the city in the 2000s. The city found success when the Hornets elected to move to Louisiana in 2002, after considering both New Orleans and Memphis (where the Grizzlies eventually moved). When the New Orleans Hornets renamed themselves the New Orleans Pelicans in 2013, the city of Charlotte reclaimed the Hornets name in 2014 by renaming the Charlotte Bobcats into the Hornets again. As part of a settlement, the second incarnation of the Charlotte Hornets reclaimed the records and history of the 1988–2002 Charlotte Hornets.

Relocation speculation
By the 1994 NBA All-Star Game, there was speculation as to whether or not the Timberwolves would remain in Minneapolis following the 1994–95 season. On February 11, 1994, NBA commissioner David Stern announced that he and his representatives would serve as mediators in an effort to resolve issues related to the debt owed on the Target Center, the Timberwolves home arena. The Timberwolves ownership was seeking a public or private entity to purchase the $73 million remaining on the arena's mortgage, otherwise the team would be sold and in all likelihood moved from Minnesota. Although mediation talks were just beginning to keep the team in place, by the following week it was revealed that ownership had met with representatives from San Diego, Nashville and New Orleans to discuss the potential relocation of the franchise. By late February, New Orleans emerged as the likely city for the team to relocate to if a deal could not be reached to keep the team in Minneapolis. This became the case after the potential ownership group Top Rank signed a letter of intent to purchase the team and move it to New Orleans if debt issues at the Target Center were not resolved.

Although a potential local ownership group was identified in late February, local opposition to a perceived bailout of multi-millionaire ownership began to take hold. A citizens opposition group called Don't Target Us (referencing the Target Center in their name) formed to voice their opposition to a public purchase of the facility. Additionally, polling at the time showed support for public intervention as being unfavorable with 60 percent of those polled being against intervention. However, support for intervention on the arena issue began to take shape as well, with several at the local and state level stating their intention to make a deal happen. Additionally, businesses near the arena started a campaign to keep the team in Minneapolis.

While political maneuvering was continuing in Minnesota, by early April it was reported that Nashville had become the favored place for relocation over New Orleans. The Nashville offer became the preferred option as it included $80 million for the franchise from Gaylord Entertainment and an additional $20 million to be paid to the city of Minneapolis to pay down debt at the Target Center. New Orleans later reemerged as the lead candidate for relocation by the end of April when Top Rank announced a purchase price of $152.5 million. By early May, the Minnesota state legislature approved a bill that would use public funds to purchase the Target Center for $48 million. The purchase by the state was contingent on ownership agreeing to keep the franchise in the arena for 30 years. However, ownership could not find a local suitor willing to pay what Top Rank had offered for the franchise setting the stage for relocation.

Proposed move to New Orleans
After months of speculation, on May 23, 1994, Top Rank successfully purchased the franchise for $152.5 million with the intention of relocating it to New Orleans. The purchase occurred following an agreement between Top Rank and Timberwolves ownership that allowed Top Rank to purchase the franchise if no local ownership groups were found by May 20, 1994. On June 6, 1994, Top Rank officially filed the paperwork to the NBA seeking to relocate the Timberwolves to New Orleans for the 1994–95 NBA season. The filings also identified Fred Hofheinz as the sole Top Rank stockholder, with Houston lawyer John O'Quinn and stockbroker Robert Higley serving as the team's major partners.

With the timber wolf being a species not native to Louisiana, there was much speculation as to what the relocated franchise would be called. Although never officially changed, a few new names were proposed; New Orleans Mayor Marc Morial advocated for the team be called the Rhythm, while Louisiana Governor Edwin Edwards suggested the team be renamed the Angels. After speculation as to where the team would play their home games while a new arena was constructed, Superdome officials notified the league that enough dates would be available to schedule 41 home games at the dome for the 1994–95 season. Prior to this announcement, the team was rumored to play games at the Lakefront Arena, the Pete Maravich Assembly Center in Baton Rouge, or the Mississippi Coast Coliseum in Biloxi, Mississippi when the Superdome was unavailable.

Remaining in Minneapolis
On June 15, 1994, the National Basketball Association's franchise relocation committee voted unanimously to block the sale of the franchise to Top Rank resulting in the Timberwolves remaining in Minneapolis through at least the 1994–95 season. Top Rank's offer was rejected by the league due to questions surrounding their financing plan. The $152 million purchase price would have been paid for through $40 million from unknown investors; up to $76.25 million in loans from banks that had yet to make commitments; and $50 million or more from undisclosed sources based on projected revenues from the un-built arena in New Orleans. Also, the league filed a lawsuit in U.S. District Court in Minneapolis seeking an injunction against any transfer of the team from Minnesota. On June 21, 1994, the league officially denied sale of the franchise to Top Rank resulting in the Timberwolves remaining in Minneapolis. On June 28, 1994, Top Rank would file a counter-suit in Louisiana Civil District Court. The suit sought to have ownership fulfill their contractual obligation to sell the team to Top Rank. The following day, federal district court ruled that the franchise was to remain in Minneapolis through June 15, 1995.

After over eight months of working to purchase the franchise, local businessman Bill Sexton withdrew his bid to purchase the Timberwolves in August. However, Glen Taylor later headed a group to purchase the team with the NBA approving the transaction in October 1994. By 1995 Top Rank would enter involuntary bankruptcy and as a result, the NBA rejected their offer securing the franchise in Minneapolis.

In the years following the attempt to relocate the Timberwolves, the New Orleans Regional Basketball Alliance sought to lure an existing franchise to the city. After completion of the New Orleans Arena, the Alliance led efforts to relocate the Vancouver Grizzlies to the city. The New Orleans bid ultimately lost out to Memphis, and by early 2002 the city looked to the Charlotte Hornets to potentially relocate to the city. The Hornets became an likely candidate to relocate following a failed referendum for a new arena in Charlotte. On May 10, 2002, the NBA voted in favor of the relocation of the Hornets to New Orleans marking the return of the NBA to the city since the relocation of the New Orleans Jazz to Salt Lake City in 1979. In November 2002, the Timberwolves made their first trip to New Orleans since the failed relocation efforts of the Top Rank group in 1994.

See also
 Failed relocation of the Sacramento Kings
 List of relocated National Basketball Association teams
 Relocation of professional sports teams in Canada and the United States

References

Minnesota Timberwolves
National Basketball Association controversies
Basketball in New Orleans
Relocated National Basketball Association teams
1994 in sports in Minnesota
1994 in sports in Louisiana